Geogaddi is the second studio album by Scottish electronic music duo Boards of Canada. It was released on 13 February 2002 in Japan, then five days later in Europe, by Warp. The album is aesthetically and stylistically darker than the approach established on their previous studio album Music Has the Right to Children (1998), and it has subsequently been praised as a standout album in the duo's discography.

Geogaddi reached number 21 on the UK album charts and received critical acclaim upon release, in addition to being acclaimed by several publications as one of the year's best albums.

Background and composition
Compared to their previous releases, Boards of Canada aimed to record a project "with more facets, more detail and a kind of concentrated recipe of chaotic little melodies", as well as something "more fuzzy and organic". The duo recorded over 90 tracks for the project from 1999 to 2001, ultimately choosing 23 based on how well they fit the intended atmosphere of the album. Michael Sandison, half of the duo, stated that much of the album features acoustic instrumentation, though it may not be immediately evident because of how processed and often faint it is, blending with electronic elements. 

The album was described by Sandison as "a record for some sort of trial-by-fire, a claustrophobic, twisting journey that takes you into some pretty dark experiences before you reach the open air again." The September 11 attacks drastically influenced the tone of the album during its production in 2001, with the duo "glued to the TV for the whole day" and Sandison saying that they had subsequently been pushed "into making a darker record".

Boards of Canada have claimed that the title is a combination of different words with a particular significance, but also that they wanted listeners to decide on their own interpretations of the title as well as the album in total. The album has been noted for featuring esoteric references and subliminal messages, including references to Satanism, numerology and cult leader David Koresh of the Branch Davidians. They additionally received the idea to make the total album length 66 minutes and 6 seconds from Warp Records president Steve Beckett, with his reasoning being to joke around with listeners and imply that the Devil had been involved with the album's production.

Release
Geogaddi was first released in Japan on 13 February 2002. It was released by Warp on 18 February 2002 in Europe. The album has been released on compact disc, vinyl, digital download and as a limited edition compact disc.

The album is available in three formats: Standard jewel case CD packaging, limited edition hardbound book packaged with a CD and extra artwork enclosed, and a triple record package. Side F of the vinyl package, with the track "Magic Window" (which consists of nearly two minutes of silence), is uncut and contains a visible etching of a nude nuclear family.

The artwork of the album carries a distinct kaleidoscopic motif. The limited edition version comes with a 12-page booklet exhibiting artwork.

Reception

Geogaddi holds a score of 84 out of 100 from review aggregate site Metacritic based on 21 critics' reviews, indicating "universal acclaim". Kitty Empire of NME praised it as "easily the electronic album of the year" and "a meeting of the natural with the digital, [...] eerier than ever before," as well as "deliciously saturated with the recurring motifs which have marked them out as an individual voice in electronic music." Mark Richardson of Pitchfork wrote that "the Boards have implemented their trademark tools on Geogaddi, but in the service of a slightly gloomier vision," noting that they "have always had a disorienting cast to their music, [...] but where the warbles once seemed designed to evoke the sensation of strained memory, the distortions now have a disturbing undercurrent." He ultimately called it "a very accomplished album packed with great music." Pascal Wyse of The Guardian characterised it as "the band's own reticent blend of electronic melancholy, always organic and beautifully crafted," but noted that the listener's enjoyment "just depends whether you want to go into that much detail."

Geogaddi was ranked on year-end lists of the best albums of 2002 by numerous publications, such as Mojo, NME, Uncut and The Wire. In 2014, Vice described the album as mourning "the idea of a utopian innocence as a possibility," summing the album's distinction from its predecessor as follows: Sounds of nature, warm synths, samples of educational broadcasts from childhood [are] techniques to re-mystify the world around us. But such a world of mystery doesn't merely comprise images of simpler times, and a more perfect world. Turning away from reason entails acknowledging evil, and it is here where the subtle shift from Music Has the Right to Children to Geogaddi is most significant.

In 2017, Pitchfork placed Geogaddi at number five on its list of "The 50 Best IDM Albums of All Time".

Track listing

Personnel
Boards of Canada
 Marcus Eoin – production, artwork, photography
 Michael Sandison – production, artwork, photography

Additional personnel
 Peter Campbell – cover photograph

Charts

Certifications

References

External links
 Geogaddi  at Warp
 
 
 Analysis of the meaning of Geogaddi titles, with quotes

Boards of Canada albums
2002 albums
Warp (record label) albums
Hauntology